Southsea Hoverport is adjacent to Clarence Pier in the Southsea area of Portsmouth in southern England. From here frequent hovercraft services leave for Ryde on the Isle of Wight. The journey time is quicker than the conventional boats that sail from Gunwharf Quay, elsewhere in Portsmouth, but the hovercraft are more prone to service curtailment in inclement weather. Another problem are connections from here as when the service first started in the mid-20th century much of the land closer to Portsmouth and Southsea station was already occupied by both residential and naval units. To help alleviate this problem Stagecoach run the "Hoverbus" linking the terminal with Portsmouth and Southsea station and Portsmouth city centre. The nearest railway station is Portsmouth Harbour railway station, although Portsmouth and Southsea station is not much further away.

See also
Hovertravel

Geograph 

Transport in Portsmouth
Hovercraft